The U.S. state of Wyoming lies in the Mountain West subregion of the Western United States and has a varied geography. It is bordered by Montana to the north and northwest, South Dakota and Nebraska to the east, Idaho to the west, Utah to the southwest, and Colorado to the south. Wyoming is the least populous U.S. state and has the second-lowest population density behind Alaska.

Wyoming's western half is covered mostly by the ranges and rangelands of the Rocky Mountains, while the eastern half of the state is high-elevation prairie called the High Plains. It is drier and windier than the rest of the country, being split between semi-arid and continental climates with greater temperature extremes. Almost half of the land in Wyoming is owned by the federal government, generally protected for public uses. The state ranks 6th by area and fifth by proportion of a state's land owned by the federal government. Federal lands within Wyoming include two national parks (Grand Teton and Yellowstone), two national recreation areas, two national monuments, several national forests, historic sites, fish hatcheries, and wildlife refuges.

Climate

Wyoming's climate is generally semi-arid and continental (Köppen climate classification BSk), and is drier and windier in comparison to most of the United States with greater temperature extremes. Much of this is due to the topography of the state. Summer nights throughout the state are characterized by a rapid cooldown with even the hottest locations averaging in the  range at night. In most of the state, most of the precipitation tends to fall in the late spring and early summer. Winters are cold, but are variable with periods of sometimes extreme cold interspersed between generally mild periods, with Chinook winds providing unusually warm temperatures in some locations.

Precipitation depends on elevation with lower areas in the Big Horn Basin averaging , making the area nearly a true desert. Some mountain areas do receive a good amount of precipitation,  or more, much of it as snow, sometimes  or more annually.

The number of thunderstorm days vary across the state with the southeastern plains of the state having the most days of thunderstorm activity. Thunderstorm activity in the state is highest during the late spring and early summer. The southeastern corner of the state is the most vulnerable part of the state to tornado activity. Moving away from that point and westwards, the incidence of tornadoes drops dramatically with the west part of the state showing little vulnerability. Tornadoes, where they occur, tend to be small and brief, unlike some of those that occur farther east. The most destructive tornado to occur in Wyoming happened on July 16, 1979 in Cheyenne and caused one death and 40 injuries.

Climate data

Location and size

As specified in the designating legislation for the Territory of Wyoming, Wyoming's borders are lines of latitude 41°N and 45°N, and longitude 104°3'W and 111°3'W (27 and 34 west of the Washington Meridian)—a geodesic quadrangle. Wyoming is one of only three states (the others being Colorado and Utah) to have borders defined by only "straight" lines. Due to surveying inaccuracies during the 19th century, Wyoming's legal border deviates from the true latitude and longitude lines by up to half of a mile (0.8 km) in some spots, especially in the mountainous region along the 45th parallel. Wyoming is bordered on the north by Montana, on the east by South Dakota and Nebraska, on the south by Colorado, on the southwest by Utah, and on the west by Idaho. It is the tenth largest state in the United States in total area, containing  and is made up of 23 counties.

Natural landforms

Mountain ranges

The Great Plains meet the Rocky Mountains in Wyoming. The state is a great plateau broken by many mountain ranges. In the northwest are the Absaroka, Owl Creek, Gros Ventre, Wind River, and the Teton ranges. In the north central are the Big Horn Mountains; in the northeast, the Black Hills; and in the southern region the Laramie, Snowy, and Sierra Madre ranges.

The Snowy Range in the south central part of the state is an extension of the Colorado Rockies both in geology and in appearance. The Big Horn Mountains in the north central portion are somewhat isolated from the bulk of the Rocky Mountains.

The park includes the Grand Teton, the second highest peak in the state.

The Continental Divide spans north–south across the central portion of the state. Rivers east of the divide drain into the Missouri River Basin and eventually the Gulf of Mexico. They are the North Platte, Wind, Big Horn and the Yellowstone rivers. The Snake River in northwest Wyoming eventually drains into the Columbia River and the Pacific Ocean, as does the Green River through the Colorado River Basin.

The Continental Divide forks in the south central part of the state in an area known as the Great Divide Basin where water that precipitates onto or flows into it cannot reach an ocean—it all sinks into the soil and eventually evaporates.

Several rivers begin in or flow through the state, including the Yellowstone River, Bighorn River, Green River, and the Snake River.

Basins
Much of Wyoming is covered with large basins containing different eco-regions, from shrublands to smaller patches of desert. Regions of the state classified as basins contain everything from large geologic formations to sand dunes and vast unpopulated spaces. Basin landscapes are typically at lower elevations and include rolling hills, valleys, mesas, terraces and other rugged terrain, but also include natural springs as well as rivers and artificial reservoirs. They have common plant species such as various subspecies of sagebrush, juniper and grasses such as wheatgrass, but basins are known for their diversity of plant and animal species.

Islands

Wyoming has 32 named islands; the majority are in Jackson Lake and Yellowstone Lake, within Yellowstone National Park in the northwest portion of the state. The Green River in the southwest also contains a number of islands.

Regions and Administration

Counties

The state of Wyoming has 23 counties. Thirteen were there when Wyoming became a state in 1890 and ten more have been created since then.

Wyoming license plates have a number on the left that indicates the county where the vehicle is registered, ranked by an earlier census. Specifically, the numbers are representative of the property values of the counties in 1930. The county license plate numbers are:

Cities and towns

The State of Wyoming has 99 incorporated municipalities.

In 2005, 50.6% of Wyomingites lived in one of the 13 most populous Wyoming municipalities.

Metropolitan areas

The United States Census Bureau has defined two Metropolitan Statistical Areas (MSA) and seven Micropolitan Statistical Areas (MiSA) for the State of Wyoming. In 2008, 30.4% of Wyomingites lived in either of the Metropolitan Statistical Areas, and 73% lived in either a Metropolitan Statistical Area or a Micropolitan Statistical Area.

See also
 Rocky Mountains
 Geography of Montana
 Continental Divide

Notes

References

Geography of Wyoming